The 2021 European Le Mans Series was the eighteenth season of the Automobile Club de l'Ouest's (ACO) European Le Mans Series. The six-event season began at Circuit de Barcelona-Catalunya on 18th April and finished at Algarve International Circuit on 24th October.

The series was open to Le Mans Prototypes, divided into the LMP2 and LMP3 classes, and grand tourer-style racing cars in the LMGTE class.

Calendar 
The calendar for the 2021 season was announced on 8 October 2020. The Red Bull Ring returned to the series after a two-year absence, while Silverstone was not featured on the calendar.

Entries

LMP2 
All cars in the LMP2 class used the Gibson GK428 V8 engine and Goodyear tyres. Entries in the LMP2 Pro-Am Cup, set aside for teams with a Bronze-rated driver in their line-up, are denoted with Icons.

Innovative car

LMP3
All cars in the LMP3 class used the Nissan VK56DE 5.6L V8 engine and Michelin tyres.

LMGTE 
All cars in the LMGTE class use Goodyear tyres.

Results and standings

Race results 
Bold indicates overall winner.

Drivers' Championships 
Points are awarded according to the following structure:

LMP2 Drivers Championship

LMP2 Pro-Am Drivers Championship

LMP3 Drivers Championship

LMGTE Drivers Championship

Teams' Championships 
Points are awarded according to the following structure:

LMP2 Teams Championship

LMP2 Pro-Am Teams Championship

LMP3 Teams Championship

LMGTE Teams Championship

Notes

References

External links

European Le Mans Series seasons
European Le Mans Series
Le Mans Series
European Le Mans